Legislative Assembly elections were held in Arunachal Pradesh on April 11 to elect the 60 members of Legislative Assembly. The term of Arunachal Pradesh Legislative Assembly ends on June 1, 2019.
This results in a landslide victory for Bharatiya Janata Party and its allies. Pema Khandu took oath as Arunachal Pradesh Chief Minister on 29 May 2019.

Results

By constituency 
Three-member of the Bharatiya Janata Party, Phurpa Tsering from Dirang, Taba Tedir from Yachuli and Kento Jini from Along East were elected unopposed after others' candidature was rejected or the candidates withdrew themselves.

Consequences
Some major political consequences were:
 National People's Party was accorded the status of National Party from Election Commission of India as it got 5 seats in the assembly with a vote share of 14.56% getting also the status of a Recognized State Party in Arunachal Pradesh.
 Janata Dal (United) party got the status of a Recognized State Party by the Election Commission of India as it secured 7 seats in the assembly winning a vote share of 9.88% in the state.

See also
2019 elections in India
2019 Indian general election
2014 Arunachal Pradesh Legislative Assembly election
 Second Pema Khandu ministry

References

State Assembly elections in Arunachal Pradesh
2010s in Arunachal Pradesh
Arunachal Pradesh